Frederick Charles "Fred" Orlofsky (born April 8, 1937) is a retired American artistic gymnast. He competed at the 1960 Summer Olympics and finished fifth with the team. He was part of the American team than won a gold medal at the 1963 Pan American Games.

Domestically Orlofsky mostly competed for the Southern Illinois University. He won 1960 AAU titles in all-around, rings, and parallel bars, placing second on the horizontal bar and third on the pommel horse. He won a 1961 NCAA title on the rings and placed second all-around in 1961–63. After retiring from competitions he coached gymnasts at Western Michigan University from 1966 to 1996. Between 1964 and 2000 he also judged competitions, both nationally and internationally. In 1985 he was inducted into the U.S. Gymnastics Hall of Fame.

Orlofsky is married to Holly Dee Brown, they have three children. He lives in Florida.

References

1937 births
Living people
American male artistic gymnasts
Gymnasts at the 1960 Summer Olympics
Olympic gymnasts of the United States
Pan American Games medalists in gymnastics
Pan American Games gold medalists for the United States
People from North Bergen, New Jersey
Sportspeople from Hudson County, New Jersey
Gymnasts at the 1963 Pan American Games
Medalists at the 1963 Pan American Games
20th-century American people
21st-century American people